The Great Rupert is a 1950 comedy family film starring Jimmy Durante, Tom Drake and Terry Moore, produced by George Pal and directed by Irving Pichel. It is based on a story written by Ted Allan that has also been published as a children's book under the title Willie the Squowse.

The story revolves around a little animated squirrel who, with much charm, accidentally helps two economically distressed families overcome their obstacles.

Plot
Joe Mahoney, a vaudeville performer who has fallen on hard times, has to leave his best friend and stage companion Rupert, a dancing squirrel, in the town. Rupert will have to fend for himself with the other squirrels and live in a tree. Mahoney had been renting a flat (attached to the Dingle house) from the Dingle family consisting of miserly father Frank, his wife and their son Pete, an aspiring composer. Frank recently learned a gold mine he'd invested in years earlier will start paying a return of $1500 a week. Frank begins cashing the checks and hiding the bills in a hollow baseboard.

A family of happy but impoverished acrobats, the Amendolas, move into Mahoney's former flat. Unsatisfied with tree life, Rupert also finds his way back to his old house. Rosalinda Amendola is in love with Pete Dingle.

Back in his old drey, Rupert makes space by clearing out Frank's hidden cache of money. As he throws the bills out, they float down into the Amendola house appearing to be sent from heaven in answer to Rosalinda's mother's prayers. Since Frank's gold mine pays weekly, he deposits money in the same spot every Thursday between 3-3:30 and this scene repeats itself many times. 

The Amendolas spread their wealth around, investing in small businesses all over town. As citizens begins to gossip about the source of Amendola's money, taxmen and police converge on the Amendola house demanding answers right around the same time Frank is informed the gold mine is tapped out. While the IRS agent and police officers wait for the miracle money to appear, Rupert catches a lit cigarette and stores it in his drey where it starts a fire that engulfs the Dingle home.

Outside, during the ensuing blaze, the Amendolas are told by an inconsolable Frank about the hidden (presumed burned) cash and promise to help him rebuild the house. Rupert, having been saved by firefighters, goes back to the park where he is picked up by Mr. Mahoney and enlisted in a newly-minted circus act.

In the final scene, the families tour the rebuilt home and learn that an oil well Pete had invested in finally came in and his music ("Music for Orphaned Instruments") was purchased by a song publisher. It plays on a car radio as the group celebrates and Pete and Rosalinda embrace.

Cast
 Jimmy Durante as Mr. Louie Amendola
 Terry Moore as Rosalinda Amendola
 Tom Drake as Peter 'Pete' Dingle
 Frank Orth as Mr. Frank Dingle
 Sara Haden as Mrs. Katie Dingle
 Queenie Smith as Mrs. Amendola
 Chick Chandler as Phil Davis
 Jimmy Conlin as Joe Mahoney
 Rupert, an animated squirrel
 Hugh Sanders as Mulligan
 Don Beddoe as Mr. Haggerty
 Candy Candido as Molineri - Florist
 Clancy Cooper as Police Lt. Saunders
 Harold Goodwin as Callahan - F.B.I. Man
 Frank Cady as Mr. Taney - Tax Investigator
 Irving Pichel as Puzzled Pedestrian (uncredited)

Production
In 1949, the film's producer George Pal, who had formerly produced animated shorts, convinced the independent Eagle-Lion Films to co-finance a two-picture deal with him. These films would be The Great Rupert and Destination Moon.

The film was originally known as Money, Money, Money and was based on a story by Ted Allen purchased by Pal in June 1948. It was adapted by Laszlo Vadnay. Filming started at General Service Studio on June 20, 1949.

At one stage the film was called The Great Amandola; at another, it was Rupert II.

Pal's stop-motion animation used in creating the illusion of the dancing squirrel was so realistic that he received many inquiries about where he had located a trained squirrel.

In 1999, Arnold Leibovit Entertainment rereleased the film on DVD and in 2022 a high definition restored unedited version was released with original main titles to the various streaming platforms such as TubiTV, Amazon, Plex, Apple TV and others.

In 2003, 20th Century Fox and Legend Films revived the public domain film with a colorized special edition under the title A Christmas Wish. For that release, Terry Moore provided an audio commentary track.

See also
 List of films in the public domain in the United States

References

External links

 
 
 
 
 

1950 films
1950s Christmas films
1950s Christmas comedy films
1950s fantasy comedy films
1950s stop-motion animated films
American black-and-white films
American Christmas comedy films
American fantasy comedy films
Eagle-Lion Films films
Films about entertainers
Films about squirrels
Films directed by Irving Pichel
Films produced by George Pal
Films scored by Leith Stevens
1950s English-language films
1950s American films